The 1997 Tour de France was the 84th edition of Tour de France, one of cycling's Grand Tours. The Tour began in Rouen with a prologue individual time trial on 5 July and Stage 10 occurred on 15 July with a mountainous stage to Andorra Arcalis. The race finished on the Champs-Élysées in Paris on 27 July.

Prologue
5 July 1997 — Rouen,  (ITT)

Stage 1
6 July 1997 — Rouen to Forges-les-Eaux,

Stage 2
7 July 1997 — Saint-Valery-en-Caux to Vire,

Stage 3
8 July 1997 — Vire to Plumelec,

Stage 4
9 July 1997 — Plumelec to Le Puy du Fou,

Stage 5
10 July 1997 — Chantonnay to La Châtre,

Stage 6
11 July 1997 — Le Blanc to Marennes,

Stage 7
12 July 1997 — Marennes to Bordeaux,

Stage 8
13 July 1997 — Sauternes to Pau,

Stage 9
14 July 1997 — Pau to Loudenvielle,

Stage 10
15 July 1997 — Luchon to Andorra Arcalis,

References

1997 Tour de France
Tour de France stages